The following lists are for team Football at the 1968 Summer Olympics – Men's European Qualifiers.

Group 1

First round

|}
Albania withdrew.

Second round

|}
Yugoslavia withdrew.

Third round

|}

Group 2
Hosted in Bulgaria

First round

|}

Second round

|}

Third round

|}

Group 3
Hosted in France

First round

|}

Second round

|}

Third round

|}

Group 4
Hosted in Spain

First round

|}

Second round

|}
Italy withdrew.

Third round

|}

References 

Football qualification for the 1968 Summer Olympics
1968 in Mexican sports